B J McLachlan Stakes is a registered Brisbane Racing Club Group 3 Thoroughbred horse race for two-year-olds run at set weights over a distance of 1200 metres at Doomben Racecourse, Brisbane, Australia in late December. Total prizemoney is A$250,000.

History
The race is named in honour of former horse trainer Bruce McLachlan.  McLachlan won 16 Brisbane Metropolitan Training Premierships, and trained over 3000 winners in a forty-year training career.

Name
1982–1986 - O'Brien Glass Plate
1987–1993 -  Chinatown Stakes
1994–1997 - BATC Stakes
1998–2008 - Tommy Smith Slipper
2009 onwards - B J McLachlan Stakes

Grade
1982–2010 - Listed Race
2011 onwards - Group 3

Venue
1982–2013 - Doomben Racecourse
2014–2015 - Gold Coast Racecourse (due to renovations at Eagle Farm the BRC has moved the event) 
2016 - Eagle Farm Racecourse
2017–2018 - Doomben Racecourse
2019 - Eagle Farm Racecourse

Winners

2021 - Coolangatta
2020 - Alpine Edge
2019 - King's Legacy
2018 - Sun City
2017 - Meryl
2016 - Ours To Keep
2015 - Zelady's Night Out
2014 - Mishani Honcho
2013 - Unencumbered
2012 - Missy Longstocking
2011 - Driefontein
2010 - Military Grace
2009 - Military Rose 
2008 (Dec.) - Paprika 
2008 †(Mar.) - She's Meaner 
2006 - Miss Watagan 
2005 - Master Archie 
2004 - Snitzel 
2003 - Oratorio 
2002 - How Funny 
2001 - Sunday Joy 
2000 - Shovoff 
1999 - race not held
1998 - Territorial
1997 - Mr. Innocent
1996 - Guineas
1995 - Sovereign State
1994 - Pottinger
1994 - Brave Warrior
1992 - Gem Of The West
1991 - Facile
1990 - Unbid Slam
1989 - St. Jude
1988 - Scomasc
1988 - Prince Regent
1987 - Wear The Crown
1985 - Roro
1984 - Lady Lustre
1983 - Crawford 
1982 - Spanian

† Race rescheduled due to equine influenza.

See also
 List of Australian Group races
 Group races

References

Horse races in Australia
Flat horse races for two-year-olds